The Cerro Bola is a coastal metavolcanic mountain formation in northwestern Baja California. The Cerro Bola, along with the nearby mountain Cerro Gordo form the highest elevation areas of Tijuana Municipality. The mountain range is host to a number of rare and endemic plant species, such as Arctostaphylos bolensis and Ceanothus bolensis.

Geography 
The Cerro Bola and the Cerro Gordo form the two prominent metavolcanic peaks in the area, while to the south of the peaks, the landscape transforms into volcanic tablelands.

Hiking 
A  out-and-back trail (SP-CBO-10 "Cerro Bola") provides access to the summit of the mountain, offering panoramic views at the top. The trail was inaugurated in November of 2019 by the Secretary of Sustainable Economy and Tourism of the State of Baja California, Mario Escobedo Carignan, as part of an effort to increase the number of destinations in the region for nature tourism and hiking. The project was financed by the Tecate Economic Development Commission. The trailhead is located in the Valle de Las Palmas, off of Mexican Federal Highway 3.

Ecology 
The Cerro Bola and Cerro Gordo formation are a representative of a "sky island" coastal bioclimatic zone, which includes other mountains such as Otay, Sycuan, McGinty, Cerro San Ysidro, and Tecate Peak. These mountains all hold some of the largest remaining areas of intact Diegan coastal sage scrub, mafic chaparral, and gabbroic and metavolcanic soils that support numerous endemic plant species. The mafic chaparral on the Cerro Bola hosts endemic species, alongside distributions of some other rare species only found on the other "sky islands." The pristine status of the habitat and number of rare and endemic plants have made the area of high priority to conservationists.

In the mafic chaparral, two endemic species are found, the Bola manzanita, Arctostaphylos bolensis and the Bola ceanothus, Ceanothus bolensis.

Large groves of Cupressus forbesii are present in the foothills and mesas in the southern part of the mountain range, with some occasional stands of Pinus attenuata among them. Canyon live oak, Quercus chrysolepis, is also present in northern exposures of peaks in the range. Ceanothus papillosus only appears in Baja California on this peak. Some rare fragrant shrubs in the mint family are also present on the mountain. The heart-leaf pitcher sage, Lepechinia cardiophylla, is found on the mountain's peak, along with San Miguel savory, Clinopodium chandleri, which can be found on the chaparral of the north slope.

On the eastern side of the Cerro Bola, the westernmost population of California fan palm, Washingtonia filifera, is found. Growing in arroyos and canyons draining down from the mountain, it is also the only natural population of fan palm found on the western side of the Peninsular Ranges divide. Surrounding the mountain in the clay terraces of the Valle de Las Palmas are numerous vernal pools, which include rare species such as Navarretia prostrata and an undescribed species of Pogogyne.

See also 

 Otay Mountain
 Otay Mountain Wilderness
 San Diego National Wildlife Refuge
 San Miguel Mountain
 Tecate Peak
 McGinty Mountain
 Lepechinia ganderi
 Arctostaphylos otayensis
 XHDTV

Citations

References 

 
 
 
 
 
 
 
 
 
 

Mountain ranges of Baja California
Peninsular Ranges